Kim Seung-jun (Hangul: 김승준; born October 17, 1967) is a South Korean voice actor born and raised in Seoul, South Korea.

In 1990, he debuted as a voice actor by joining Korean Broadcasting System's Voice Acting Division. After four years of exclusive work at KBS, he became a freelancer.

In the late 1990s, Kim shot to stardom with voicing Zelgadis Greywords on Slayers and Kaede Rukawa on Slam Dunk. Since then, he has voiced leading roles in a variety of animated works including Pet Shop of Horrors, His and Her Circumstances, Saiyuki, Fruits Basket, The Prince of Tennis, Detective School Q and Demon King from Today!. For movie fans, he is well recognized for covering film stars such as Brad Pitt, Christian Bale, Cillian Murphy, Johnny Depp, Leslie Cheung, Matt Damon and Stephen Chow. Kim also dubbed Saladin on a 1999 South Korean role-playing video game The War of Genesis III.

Many fans of Kim often refer to him as 왕자님 (Wang-ja-nim) meaning "The Prince". The nickname seems to have been derived from his tender voice and the characters who the voice actor mainly dubs.

Kim is best known for his voicing SpongeBob SquarePants on the Korean dub of SpongeBob SquarePants, Sesshomaru on the Korean dub of InuYasha, Roronoa Zoro on the Korean dub of a Japanese television animation series One Piece, the Tenth Doctor on the Korean dub of a British science fiction television series Doctor Who and more recently, Captain Marvelous on the Korean dub of Kaizoku Sentai Gokaiger.

Career

Voice acting

TV animation dubbing
A
 Animal Detective Kiruminzoo (쥬로링 동물탐정, KBS)
 Pulse Ryūdō (Ruth on the Korean TV edition)
 Taizo Sanders (Akori on the Korean TV edition)
 Tatsurou Komusubi (Mr. Stumpy on the Korean TV edition)

B
 Being Ian (꿈을 찍는 이안, EBS)
 Ian Kelley
 Black Cat (블랙 캣, Animax)
 Train Heartnet
 Blood+ (블러드 플러스, Animax)
 Hagi

C
 Le Chevalier D'Eon (슈발리에, Animax)
 D'Eon de Beaumont
 Cooking Master Boy (요리왕 비룡, KBS)
 Leon (Il-seok on the Korean TV edition)
 Shouan (Jang-poong on the Korean TV edition)
 Cowboy Bebop (Tooniverse)
 Grencia Mars Elijah Guo Eckener
 Curious George (호기심 많은 조지, EBS)
 The Man with the Yellow Hat
 Curious Play (환상게임, Tooniverse)
 Tamahome (Yoo-gui on the Korean TV edition)

D
 The Daughter of Twenty Faces (20면상의 아가씨, Animax)
 Twenty Faces
 Demon King from Today! (오늘부터 마왕!, Animax)
 Wolfram von Bielefeld See "볼프람 (김승준 분)".
 Detective Conan (명탐정 코난, Animax/KBS/Tooniverse)
 Harley Hartwell (Ha In-seong on the Animax/KBS edition)
 Makoto Okuda (Ock Tae-seong) on the episodes "Murderer, Shinichi Kudo" and "Shinichi's True Face and Ran's Tears" (on the Tooniverse edition)
 Detective School Q (탐정학원 Q, Tooniverse)
 Ryū Amakusa
 Dragon (내 친구 드래곤, EBS)
 Beaver
 Dragon Ball (드래곤볼, SBS)
 Yamcha
 Dragon Ball Z (드래곤볼 Z, SBS)
 Yamcha
 Dragon Ball Z Kai (드래곤볼 Z 카이, Champ TV)
 Vegeta

F
 The Fairly OddParents (별난 깜찍 수호천사, EBS)
 Cosmo (Byeol-nan on the Korean TV edition)
 Fruits Basket (후르츠 바스켓, AniOne TV)
 Yuki Sohma (Song Yoo-jin on the Korean TV edition)
 Futari wa Pretty Cure (빛의 전사 프리큐어, SBS)
 Pisard
 Shougo Fujimura (Noh Yoo-cheon on the Korean TV edition)
 Future GPX Cyber Formula (영광의 레이서, KBS)
 Asurada (Unicorn on the Korean TV edition)
 Knight Shoemach

H
 His and Her Circumstances (그 남자 그 여자, Tooniverse)
 Soichiro Arima (Ji Seong-jun on the Korean TV edition)
 Honey and Clover (허니와 클로버, Animax)
 Takumi Mayama See "마야마 타쿠미 (김승준 분)".

I
 InuYasha (이누야샤, Champ TV)
 Sesshomaru See "셋쇼마루 (김승준 분)". See "셋쇼마루 (김승준 분)". See "셋쇼마루 (김승준 분)".

L
 The Legend of the Legendary Heroes (마법전사 라이너, KBS)
 Sion Astal
 Legendz (용의 전설 레전더, SBS)
 Bruno Sparks
 Shiron the Windragon

M
 Magi: The Labyrinth of Magic (마기, Cartoon Network Korea)
 Sinbad
 My Little Pony: Friendship Is Magic (마이리틀포니, Tooniverse)
 Time Turner/Doctor Whooves

N
 Nurse Angel Ririka SOS (리리카 SOS, KBS)
 Kanon
O
 One Piece (원피스, AniOne TV/Champ TV/KBS/Tooniverse)
 Roronoa Zoro See "조로 (김승준 분)".
 Origami Warriors (접지전사, SBS)
 Hyeon Dal-gook

P
 Patlabor (기동경찰 패트레이버, Tooniverse)
 Asuma Shinohara (Baek Jeong-woo on the Korean TV edition)
 Pet Shop of Horrors (펫샵 오브 호러즈, Tooniverse)
 Count D
 Powerpuff Girls Z (파워퍼프걸 Z, Cartoon Network Korea)
 Professor Utonium
 The Prince of Tennis (테니스의 왕자, SBS)
 Shusuke Fuji (Yoo Jin on the Korean TV edition)

S
 Saiyuki (환상마전 최유기, AniOne TV)
 Cho Hakkai (Pal-gye on the Korean TV edition)
 Saiyuki Reload Gunlock (최유기 Reload Gunlock, Tooniverse)
 Cho Hakkai (Pal-gye on the Korean TV edition)
 Scryed (스크라이드, Tooniverse)
 Ryuho
 SD Gundam Sangokuden Brave Battle Warriors (SD 건담 삼국전, Champ TV)
 Sousou Gundam
 Shōnen Onmyōji (소년 음양사, Animax)
 Rikugō
 Slam Dunk (슬램덩크, SBS)
 Kaede Rukawa (Seo Tae-woong on the Korean TV edition)
 Slayers (슬레이어즈, SBS)
 Zelgadis Greywords
 SpongeBob SquarePants (네모네모 스펀지송, EBS)
 SpongeBob SquarePants (SpongeSong on the Korean TV edition)
 The Story of Saiunkoku (채운국 이야기, Animax)
 Seiran Shi (Ja Jeong-ran on the Korean TV edition) See "자정란 (김승준 분)".
 Sugar Sugar Rune (슈가슈가 룬, Tooniverse)
 Pierre Tempête de Neige

T
 Thomas & Friends (꼬마 기관차 토마스와 친구들, EBS)
 All the characters (from March 2006 until February 2011)
 The Mayor of Sodor (since February 2011)
 The Storyteller (since March 2006)
 A Town Called Panic (우당탕 마을, EBS)
 Cowboy
 The Twelve Kingdoms (12국기, AniOne TV)
 Keiki
 Twin Spica (트윈 스피카, Tooniverse)
 Mr. Lion

V
 VeggieTales (야채극장 베지테일, EBS)
 Larry the Cucumber
 Viva Piñata (비바 피냐타, Animax)
 Franklin Fizzlybear

W
 Wedding Peach (사랑의 천사 웨딩피치, SBS)
 Yousuke Fuuma (Kevin on the Korean TV edition)
 Whistle! (내일은 축구왕, Animax)
 Tatsuya Mizuno (Kim Min-cheol on the Korean TV edition)

Y
Yu-Gi-Oh! Duel Monsters (유희왕, SBS)
Ryota Kajiki (Ma Hae-ryong on the Korean TV edition)
Ryuji Otogi (Duke on the Korean TV edition)
Yu-Gi-Oh! 5D's (유희왕 5D's, Champ TV)
Jack Atlas

Animated movie dubbing

1990s

2000s

2010s

Film dubbing
0-9
 3:10 to Yuma (3:10 투 유마, KBS)
 Christian Bale as Dan Evans
 10 Promises to My Dog (개와 나의 10가지 약속, Tooniverse)
 Etsushi Toyokawa as Yuichi Saito

B
 A Better Tomorrow (영웅본색, KBS)
 Leslie Cheung as Sung Tse-Kit
 A Better Tomorrow 2 (영웅본색 2, SBS)
 Leslie Cheung as Sung Tse-Kit
 Breakfast on Pluto (플루토에서 아침을, KBS)
 Cillian Murphy as Patrick/Patricia "Kitten" Braden
 The Brothers Grimm (그림 형제: 마르바덴 숲의 전설, KBS)
 Heath Ledger as Jakob Grimm

C
 A Chinese Ghost Story (천녀유혼, KBS)
 Leslie Cheung as Ning Caichen
 A Chinese Ghost Story: Part II (천녀유혼 2, KBS)
 Leslie Cheung as Ning Caichen
 Closer (클로저, KBS)
 Clive Owen as Larry Gray
 Cool Runnings (쿨 러닝, KBS)
 Doug E. Doug as Sanka Coffie
 Crimson Rivers 2 (크림슨 리버 2, KBS)
 Benoit Magimel as Detective Reda

D
 Days of Being Wild (아비정전, KBS)
 Leslie Cheung as Yuddy
 The Departed (디파티드, KBS)
 Matt Damon as Staff Sergeant Colin Sullivan
 Django Unchained (장고: 분노의 추적자, In-Flight Movie Edition)
 Leonardo DiCaprio as Calvin J. Candie

E
 Ed Wood (에드 우드, KBS)
 Johnny Depp as Ed Wood

F
 Face/Off (페이스 오프, KBS)
 Alessandro Nivola as Pollux Troy
 The Faculty (패컬티, KBS)
 Josh Hartnett as Zeke Tyler
 Farewell My Concubine (패왕별희, KBS)
 Leslie Cheung as Cheng Dieyi

G
 Girl with a Pearl Earring (진주 귀걸이를 한 소녀, KBS)
 Cillian Murphy as Pieter
 Gokaiger Goseiger Super Sentai 199 Hero Great Battle (극장판 파워레인저: 캡틴포스 VS 미라클포스 199 히어로 대결전, Korean-dubbed edition in theaters)
 Ryota Ozawa as Captain Marvelous/Gokai Red
 Good Will Hunting (굿 윌 헌팅, KBS)
 Matt Damon as Will Hunting
 The Great Gatsby (위대한 개츠비, In-Flight Movie Edition)
 Leonardo DiCaprio as Jay Gatsby

H
 Heroic Duo (쌍웅, KBS)
 Ekin Cheng as Inspector Ken Li

I
 The Imaginarium of Doctor Parnassus (파르나서스 박사의 상상극장, KBS)
 Colin Farrell, Johnny Depp, and Jude Law as Tony within the Imaginarium
 The Incredible Hulk (인크레더블 헐크, In-Flight Movie Edition)
 Edward Norton as Dr. Bruce Banner/Hulk

K
 Kung Fu Hustle (쿵푸 허슬, KBS)
 Stephen Chow as Sing
L
 L.A. Confidential (LA 컨피덴셜, KBS)
 Guy Pearce as Det. Lt. Edmund "Ed" Exley
 Legends of the Fall (가을의 전설, KBS)
 Brad Pitt as Tristan Ludlow
 Lucky Number Slevin (럭키 넘버 슬레븐, KBS)
 Josh Hartnett as Slevin Kelevra

M
 The Machinist (머시니스트, KBS)
 Christian Bale as Trevor Reznik
 Meet the Fockers (미트 페어런츠 2, KBS)
 Owen Wilson as Kevin Rawley
 Meet the Parents (미트 페어런츠, KBS)
 Owen Wilson as Kevin Rawley
 Memento (메멘토, KBS)
 Guy Pearce as Leonard Shelby
 Moonlight Express (성월동화, KBS)
 Leslie Cheung as Shek Kar Bo/Tetsuya Misawa

N
 The Nightmare Before Christmas (크리스마스의 악몽, Korean-dubbed edition in theaters)
 Chris Sarandon as Jack Skellington

O
 Ocean's Eleven (오션스 일레븐, KBS/SBS)
 Brad Pitt as Rusty Ryan
 Ocean's Thirteen (오션스 써틴, In-Flight Movie Edition)
 Brad Pitt as Rusty Ryan

P
 Pirates of the Caribbean: At World's End (캐리비안의 해적: 세상의 끝에서, KBS)
 Johnny Depp as Captain Jack Sparrow
 Pirates of the Caribbean: The Curse of the Black Pearl (캐리비안의 해적: 블랙펄의 저주, KBS)
 Johnny Depp as Captain Jack Sparrow
 Pirates of the Caribbean: Dead Man's Chest (캐리비안의 해적: 망자의 함, KBS)
 Johnny Depp as Captain Jack Sparrow
 Purple Noon (태양은 가득히, KBS)
 Alain Delon as Tom Ripley

R
 Romeo and Juliet (로미오와 줄리엣, KBS)
 Leonard Whiting as Romeo Montague

S
 Seven (세븐, KBS)
 Brad Pitt as Detective David Mills
 Seven Years in Tibet (티벳에서의 7일, KBS)
 Brad Pitt as Heinrich Harrer
 Shanghai Knights (샹하이 나이츠, KBS)
 Owen Wilson as Roy O'Bannon
 Shanghai Noon (샹하이 눈, KBS)
 Owen Wilson as Roy O'Bannon/Wyatt Earp
 Shaolin Soccer (소림 축구, KBS)
 Stephen Chow as "Mighty Steel Leg" Sing
 The Storm Riders (풍운, KBS)
 Ekin Cheng as Whispering Wind

T
 Taxi (택시, MBC)
 Naceri as Daniel
 The Time Traveler's Wife (시간 여행자의 아내, KBS)
 Eric Bana as Henry DeTamble
 The Wind That Shakes the Barley (보리밭을 흔드는 바람, KBS)
 Cillian Murphy as Damien O'Donovan

W
 Wedding Crashers (웨딩 크래셔, KBS)
 Owen Wilson as John Beckwith

Foreign TV show dubbing
 Ben Hur (벤허, KBS)
 Joseph Morgan as Judah Ben Hur
 Charlie Jade (찰리 제이드, KBS)
 Jeffrey Pierce as Charlie Jade
 Cold Case (콜드 케이스, KBS)
 Blake Robbins and Jade Carter as David Lake on the episode "Late Returns"
 Jimmi Simpson as Ryan Bayes on the episode "Churchgoing People"
 Crouching Tiger, Hidden Dragon (와호장룡, KBS)
 Peter Ho as Luo Xiaohu
 Dinotopia (공룡의 제국, KBS)
 Tyron Leitso as Karl Scott
 Doctor Who (닥터 후, KBS)
 David Tennant as the Tenth Doctor (except on the episode "The Parting of the Ways")
 Home Improvement (아빠 뭐 하세요?, KBS)
 Taran Noah Smith as Mark Taylor
 Kaizoku Sentai Gokaiger (파워레인저 캡틴포스, Champ TV)
 Ryota Ozawa as Captain Marvelous/Gokai Red
 Masked Rider Kabuto (가면라이더 가부토, Champ TV)
 Hiro Mizushima as Souji Tendou (Kamen Rider Kabuto)
 The Legend of Tarzan (as part of The Disney Afternoon, 디즈니 만화동산: 타잔, KBS)
 Tarzan
 Ring of the Nibelungs (니벨룽겐의 반지, KBS)
 Benno Fürmann as Erik/Siegfried of Xanten
 Three Kingdoms (삼국지, KBS)
 Peter Ho as Lü Bu

Narrations
 The Age of Romance (연애시대, SBS)
 Best Food Recipe (최고의 요리비결, EBS)
 Classical Destinations (음악기행 클래식, Korean TV Edition, EBS)
 Environment Special (환경스페셜, KBS)
 Interview Game (인터뷰 게임, SBS)
 The Most Beautiful Journey in the World (세상에서 가장 아름다운 여행, SBS)
 Our Sole Earth (하나뿐인 지구, EBS)
 Supernanny (개구쟁이 길들이기, Korean TV Edition, EBS)
 tvN eNEWS (tvN 이뉴스, tvN)

Commercial film dubbing
 Heineken (하이네켄)
 Brad Pitt on a 2005 Super Bowl commercial "Beer Run"
 Nutrilite (뉴트리라이트)
 Narration for "Farmer" commercial
 Narration for "Nutrilite Double X" commercial
 Narration for "The Vitality of Plant Nutrients" commercial
 Toyota Corolla (도요타 코롤라)
 Narration for the commercial "Big Dream" featuring Hatsune Miku

Video game dubbing
 Aion Online (아이온 온라인)
 Dota 2 (도타 2)
 Timbersaw
 The Epic of the Girls in the Sengoku Period (미소녀 닌자 모험기)
 Yoshiyuki
 Kingdom Under Fire: A War of Heroes (킹덤 언더 파이어: 워 오브 히어로즈)
 Curian
 MapleStory (메이플스토리)
 Male Demonslayer
 Elsword (엘소드 온라인)
 Ain
 Mobile Suit Gundam: Encounters in Space (기동전사 건담: 해후의 우주)
 Amuro Ray
 Neon Genesis Evangelion: Girlfriend of Steel (신세기 에반게리온: 강철의 걸프렌드)
 Kozo Fuyutsuki
 Ryoji Kaji
 Shigeru Aoba
 The War of Genesis III (창세기전 3)
 Saladin
 The War of Genesis III: Part 2 (창세기전 3: 파트 2)
 Saladin

TV appearance

Stage appearance

Awards

Toonichoice

KBS Radio Drama Awards

Trivia
 Kim sang some theme songs of his works, including "A New World, the opening theme for the first season of InuYasha and "Ripped Pants", a soundtrack from SpongeBob SquarePants. The latter became popular in South Korea, through lots of Internet parodies of the lyrics beginning with "그런 짓은 하지 말아야 했는데". These parodies were used as a satire of someone for doing what should not have been done as near as the person is not stupid.

See also
 Korean Broadcasting System

References

External links
 Kim Seung-jun's profile on KBS Voice 
 소리짱 (Soryz): The official fan club of Kim Seung-jun 
 Kim Seung-jun's blog on Naver 

1967 births
Living people
South Korean male voice actors
Seoul Institute of the Arts alumni
Male actors from Seoul
Republic of Korea Marine Corps personnel